Zephyranthes rosea, commonly known as the Cuban zephyrlily, rosy rain lily, rose fairy lily, rose zephyr lily or the pink rain lily, is a species of rain lily native to Peru and Colombia. They are widely cultivated as ornamentals and have become naturalized in tropical regions worldwide. Like all rain lilies, they are known for blooming only after heavy rains.

They contain potentially lethal toxins.

Description

Zephyranthes rosea are perennial herbaceous monocots. They are small plants, reaching only  in height.

They are shorter than the style and inserted at the mouth of the perianth.

The flowers develop into capsules that are divided deeply into three lobes. The seeds are shiny black and flattened.

Classification
Zephyranthes rosea belongs to the genus Zephyranthes (rain lilies) of the subtribe Zephyranthinea of the tribe Hippeastreae. It is classified under the subfamily Amaryllidoideae of the Amaryllis family (Amaryllidaceae). In broader classifications, they are sometimes included within the lily family (Liliaceae).

Nomenclature
Zephyranthes rosea (like other rain lilies) are so named because they produce short-lived flowers only after seasonal heavy rains or storms. In Z. rosea, this usually occurs during the late summer. The generic name Zephyranthes literally means "flowers of the west wind", from Greek ζέφυρος (zéphuros, an Anemoi) and ἄνθος (anthos, 'flower'). Zephyrus, the Greek personification of the west wind, is also associated with rainfall. The specific name comes from Latin for 'rosy'.

Other common names of Z. rosea include 'pink rain lily', 'pink fairy lily', 'pink magic lily', 'pink zephyr lily', 'rain flower', and 'rose rain lily'. It is also commonly known as duende rojo ('red dwarf') and leli de San Jose in Spanish; and rosafarbene and Windblume in German.

Zephyranthes rosea is one of the two Zephyranthes species known as the 'pink rain lily'. The other species is Zephyranthes carinata, usually referred to incorrectly as Zephyranthes grandiflora. Z. carinata is often mislabeled as Z. rosea by merchants. Z. carinata can be distinguished from true Z. rosea by their much larger flowers with a deeper pink coloration. Z. rosea also has 24 chromosomes in diploid somatic cells, in contrast to 48 in Z. carinata.

Another similar species known under the same common names is Zephyranthes robusta. They can be differentiated from Z. rosea by having paler pink and larger flowers.

Distribution and habitat
Zephyranthes rosea is native to Peru and Colombia. It is widely planted in warmer regions around the world and is reportedly naturalized in Florida, India, the West Indies, many of the islands of the Pacific and Indian Oceans They are common in recently disturbed land and grassy areas (like lawns and meadows) that receive periodical rainfall.

Uses
Zephyranthes rosea are usually propagated by dividing clumps of bulbs, but can also be grown from seeds. They are widely cultivated as ornamental plants. They are relatively low-maintenance, becoming dormant during extended periods of drought. They are less tolerant of colder temperatures than other species of Zephyranthes, however.

In India, they are also used in folk medicine, along with Zephyranthes flava.

Toxicity
The bulbs of Z. rosea, like other members of Zephyranthes and Habranthus, contain various toxic alkaloids including lycorine and haemanthamine. They can cause vomiting, convulsions, and death to humans, livestock, and poultry.

Pests and diseases
Pests of Z. rosea include chewing insects. They are also vulnerable to the necrotrophic fungus Botrytis cinerea.

See also

Zephyranthes atamasca – the Atamasco lily
Zephyranthes candida – the white rain lily
Zephyranthes puertoricensis – the Puerto Rican zephyr lily
Habranthus – a closely related genus

References

rosea
Garden plants
Plants described in 1824
Flora of Colombia
Flora of Peru